Schwäbisch Hall – Hohenlohe is an electoral constituency (German: Wahlkreis) represented in the Bundestag. It elects one member via first-past-the-post voting. Under the current constituency numbering system, it is designated as constituency 268. It is located in northeastern Baden-Württemberg, comprising the districts of Hohenlohekreis and Schwäbisch Hall.

Schwäbisch Hall – Hohenlohe was created for the 1980 federal election. Since 2002, it has been represented by Christian von Stetten of the Christian Democratic Union (CDU).

Geography
Schwäbisch Hall – Hohenlohe is located in northeastern Baden-Württemberg. As of the 2021 federal election, it comprises the districts of Hohenlohekreis and Schwäbisch Hall.

History
Schwäbisch Hall – Hohenlohe was created in 1980, then known as Schwäbisch Hall. It acquired its current name in the 1994 election. In the 1980 through 1998 elections, it was constituency 172 in the numbering system. In the 2002 and 2005 elections, it was number 269. Since the 2009 election, it has been number 268. Its borders have not changed since its creation.

Members
The constituency was first represented by Philipp Jenninger of the Christian Democratic Union (CDU) from 1980 to 1990, followed by Wolfgang von Stetten from 1990 to 2002. Christian von Stetten has been representative since 2002.

Election results

2021 election

2017 election

2013 election

2009 election

References

Federal electoral districts in Baden-Württemberg
1980 establishments in West Germany
Constituencies established in 1980
Hohenlohekreis
Schwäbisch Hall (district)